{{DISPLAYTITLE:C10H14NO5PS}}
The molecular formula C10H14NO5PS may refer to:

 Parathion, an organophosphate insecticide and acaricide
 Parathion S, an organophosphate related to the organophosphate insecticide paraoxon and parathion